Lozove is a rural settlement in Yasynuvata Raion (district) in Donetsk Oblast of eastern Ukraine, at 15 km W from the centre of Donetsk city.

The settlement was taken under control of pro-Russian forces during the War in Donbass, that started in 2014.

Demographics
The settlement had 366 inhabitants in 2001. Native language as of the Ukrainian Census of 2001:
Ukrainian — 62.84%
Russian — 35.52%
Bulgarian — 0.82%
Armenian — 0.27%

References

Rural settlements in Donetsk Oblast